The Algeria women's national volleyball team represents Algeria in international volleyball competitions.

Results

Olympic Games
 2008 — 11th
 2012 — 11th

World Championship
 2010 — 21st

World Cup
 2011 — 11th
 2015 — 12th

World Grand Prix
 2013 — 20th
 2014 — 28th
 2015 — 27th
 2016 — 28th
 2017 — 32nd

African Championship

 2007  2nd
 2009  1st
 2011  2nd
 2015  2nd

African Games
 1978  Gold medal
 2007  Gold medal
 2011  Gold medal
 2015 – 5th

Mediterranean Games

 1975 – 5th
 1983 – 6th
 2009 – 7th
 2022 – 10th

Pan Arab Games
 1997  2nd
 2011  2nd

Squads

(2008–present)

2013 FIVB World Grand Prix

Lydia Oulmou No. 17, Mouni Abderrahim No. 11 (C), Zohra Bensalem No. 8, Safia Boukhima No. 12, Tassadit Aissou No. 18, Nawel Mansouri No. 13 L, Fatma-Zohra Oukazi No. 10, Silya Magnana No. 6,Salima Hamouche No. 3 L, Fatima Zahra Djouad No. 4, Kahina Messaoudene No. 14, Aicha Mezmat No. 15, Manel Yaakoubi No. 5, Celia Bourihane No. 19, Kahina Arbouche No. 20, Nawel Hammouche No. 21,Nadira Aït oumghar No. 1, Amina Saoud No. 9, Sihem Saoud No. 16, Dallal Merwa Achour No. 2, Sarra Belhocine No. 5 and Yasmine Ousalah No. 22. 
Head coach: Aimed Saidani
Second coach: Candida Rosa Jimenez Amaro

2012 Olympic Games

Lydia Oulmou No. 17 (C), Mouni Abderrahim No. 11, Zohra Bensalem No. 8, Safia Boukhima No. 12, Tassadit Aissou No. 18, Nawel Mansouri No. 13 L, Salima Hamouche No. 3 L, Sehryne Hennaoui No. 1, Amel Khamtache No. 5, Celia Bourihane No. 19, Dallal Merwa Achour No. 2, and Sarra Belhocine No. 9. 
Head coach: Georg Strumilo
Second coach: Aimed Saidani

2012 Olympic Games African qualifiers

 Fatma-Zohra Oukazi, Faïza Tsabet, Lydia Oulmou, Mouni Abderrahim, Melinda Hanaoui, Tassadit Aïssou, Salima Hamouche, Safia Boukhima, Aicha Mezmat, Zohra Bensalem, Silya Magnana and Nawel Mansouri.
Head coach: Georg Strumilo
Second coach: Aimed Saidani

2011 FIVB Women's World Cup

 Fatma-Zohra Oukazi, Faïza Tsabet, Lydia Oulmou, Mouni Abderrahim, Melinda Hanaoui, Tassadit Aïssou, Salima Hamouche, Safia Boukhima, Yasmine Oudni, Fatima Zahra Djouad, Silya Magnana and Aicha Mezmat.
Head coach: Ahmed Boukacem
Second coach: Kamel Trabelsi

2010 FIVB Women's World Championship

Narimène Madani, Fatma-Zohra Oukazi, Faïza Tsabet, Lydia Oulmou, Nawel Mansouri, Mouni Abderrahim,  Silya Magnana, Fatima Zahra Djouad, Zohra Bensalem, Tassadit Aïssou, Salima Hamouche and Safia Boukhima.
Head coach: Mouloud Ikhdji
Second coach: Boussaid Salah
Scout: Redjdal Mohand

 2010 woman's world championship Africa pool D qualifying tournament  
Narimène Madani, Fatma-Zohra Oukazi, Faïza Tsabet, Sérine Hanaoui, Lydia Oulmou, Nawel Mansouri, Mouni Abderrahim, Yasmine Oudni, Zohra Bensalem, Tassadit Aïssou, Salima Hamouche, and Safia Boukhima
Head coach: Mouloud Ikhdji
Second coach: Boussaid Salah
Scout: Redjdal Mohand

 2008 Olympic Team
Narimène Madani, Fatma-Zohra Oukazi, Faïza Tsabet, Sérine Hanaoui, Lydia Oulmou, Nawel Mansouri, Mouni Abderrahim, Melinda Hanaoui, Nassima Ben Hamouda, Tassadit Aïssou, Raouia Rouabhia, and Safia Boukhima
Head coach: Mouloud Ikhdji
Second coach: Boussaid Salah
Scout: Redjdal Mohand

References

National women's volleyball teams
Volleyball in Algeria
Women's national sports teams of Algeria